Little Ol' Cowgirl is the second studio album by American country band Dixie Chicks, released in 1992. As with their previous album, it produced no chart singles.  It was also the last album to feature Robin Lynn Macy, who left in late 1992 over a dispute with the Erwin sisters over the musical direction of the band.

The song "Past the Point of Rescue" was also recorded by Hal Ketchum on his 1991 album Past the Point of Rescue, from which it was released as a single in 1992.

Track listing
"Little Ol' Cowgirl" (Jon Ims) – 2:53
"A Road Is Just a Road" (Mary Chapin Carpenter, John Jennings) – 3:15
"She'll Find Better Things to Do" (Bob Millard) –- 3:00
"Irish Medley" (traditional) – 3:57
"You Send Me" (Sam Cooke) – 2:51
"Just a Bit Like Me" (Robin Macy) – 3:56
"A Heart That Can" (Patti Dixon) – 2:35
"Past the Point of Rescue" (Mick Hanly) – 3:30
"Beatin' Around the Bush" (Matthew Benjamin, Martie Erwin) (Instrumental) – 2:32
"Two of a Kind" (Jon Ims) – 4:12
"Standin' by the Bedside" (Ira Tucker) – 2:29
"Aunt Mattie's Quilt" (Lisa Brandenburg, Macy) – 3:57
"Hallelujah, I Love Him So" (Ray Charles) – 2:41
"Pink Toenails" (Erwin, Laura Lynch) – 3:24

Personnel
Martie Erwin – fiddle, harmony vocals
Laura Lynch – bass, vocals, harmony vocals
Robin Lynn Macy – guitar, vocals, harmony vocals
Emily Erwin – banjo, harmony vocals

Additional personnel
Matthew Benjamin – guitar
Jonathan David Brown – bagpipes
Jeff Helmer – piano
Lloyd Maines – steel guitar
Larry Seyer – rhythm guitar
Larry Spencer – trumpet
Tom Van Schaik – percussion, drums

Production
Producers: Dixie Chicks, Larry Seyer
Engineer: Larry Seyer
Arranger: Larry Seyer

References

The Chicks albums
1992 albums